José de Anchieta Gomes Patriota (born 31 March 1957) is a Brazilian politician and current mayor of Carnaíba. He has been a member of the Brazilian Socialist Party since 2000s.

Early life 
Patriota was born in Carnaíba in 1957. He lived by the Pajéu River throughout his childhood. He attended elementary school at two schools in his hometown: Joaquim Mendes da Silva and João Gomes dos Reis. He completed high school in Serra Talhada and Recife. He later became an  obstetrician-gynecologist.

Career 
In 1982, Patriota began his political career as a candidate for mayor in Carnaíba. Patriota follows his tireless struggle, running for 1992 as vice mayor of her city. From 1995 to 1998, he was director of the former X DIRES under  governor Miguel Arraes in Pernambuco. In 2000, he ran for council, where he was elected with the largest vote in the history of the city. 

In 2002, he was elected President of the city council of Carnaíba. In 2004, he won the election for mayor. Carnaiba was awarded the best IDEPE (Pernambuco Education Development Index) in the state, structured municipal health. He was highlighted in the caravan conducted by the regional council of medicine of Pernambuco. He created the music schooln Maestro Israel Gomes.

He was re-elected in 2008. In January 2013, he became the executive secretary of special projects of the secretary of cities of the state government. He ran for state deputy in 2014. In 2016, he was again a mayoral candidate, winning for the Brazilian Socialist Party (PSB) with 8,294 votes or 72.8%. 
was again candidate for mayor in the 2020 mayoral election, Anchieta was re-elected on November 15, 2020 for a fourth term with an end scheduled for 2025, won with 6,135 votes or 53.67% against 5,296 votes or 46.33% of Podemos Candidate, Gleybson Martins

References 

1957 births
Living people
Brazilian Socialist Party politicians
Pernambuco politicians